Devarshi Shah (born 07 August 1993) is an Indian actor from Gujarat, India. He is one of the rising Gujarati film actors. He is known for his role in Gujarati films Hardik Abhinandan (2016). He later starred in films like Bau Na Vichar (2019) and Raado (2022) he also appeared in TV serials Yeh Un Dinon Ki Baat Hai and Rishton Ka Chakravyuh

Career
Devarshi debuted in Gujarati cinema in 2016 with Hardik Abhinandan directed by Dev Keshwala. Later he acted in Bau Na Vichar (2019) and Raado (2022).

Filmography

References

External links

 

Living people
Male actors in Gujarati-language films
Gujarati theatre
Gujarati people
Male actors from Ahmedabad
Indian male stage actors
Indian male film actors
21st-century Indian male actors
1993 births